Ahmed Kutucu (born 1 March 2000) is a professional footballer who plays as a centre-forward for 2. Bundesliga club SV Sandhausen, on loan from Turkish club İstanbul Başakşehir. Born in Germany, he represents the Turkey national team.

Club career
Kutucu began his youth career with Sportreunde Haverkamp in 2003, before moving to the youth team of Rot-Weiss Essen in 2006. In 2011, he joined the youth sector of Schalke 04.

On 11 December 2018, Kutucu made his first team debut for Schalke in the UEFA Champions League, coming on as a substitute in the 72nd minute for Cedric Teuchert in the 1–0 home win against Lokomotiv Moscow. He scored his first Bundesliga goal on 22 December 2018, coming on as a substitute in the 73rd minute to replace Yevhen Konoplyanka in a 3–1 away win against VfB Stuttgart.

On 21 January 2021, Kutucu joined Eredivisie club Heracles Almelo on a loan deal until the end of the season.

On 4 July 2021, Kutucu moved to Turkish club İstanbul Başakşehir.

On 12 January 2022, Kutucu agreed to join 2. Bundesliga club SV Sandhausen on loan until the end of the season. On 28 June 2022, his loan was extended for a further year.

International career
Kutucu was included in Turkey's squad for the 2017 FIFA U-17 World Cup in India. He made his debut on 6 October 2017 in the first group match, opening the scoring for Turkey with a header in the 18th minute against New Zealand, with the match finishing as a 1–1 draw. He played in Turkey's remaining two matches, where they were eliminated in the tournament's group stage. The following year, he was included in Turkey's squad for the 2018 UEFA European Under-19 Championship in Finland. He played all three matches for Turkey, with the team being eliminated in the group stage.

Career statistics

Club

International

References

External links
 
 
 
 

2000 births
Living people
Sportspeople from Gelsenkirchen
Footballers from North Rhine-Westphalia
Citizens of Turkey through descent
Turkish footballers
Turkey international footballers
Turkey under-21 international footballers
Turkey youth international footballers
German footballers
German people of Turkish descent
Association football forwards
FC Schalke 04 players
FC Schalke 04 II players
Heracles Almelo players
İstanbul Başakşehir F.K. players
SV Sandhausen players
Bundesliga players
Eredivisie players
Süper Lig players
2. Bundesliga players